Puigpunyent is a municipality in western Majorca, one of the Balearic Islands, Spain.

The village is surrounded by high mountains covered in pine and evergreen oak woodland and olive, almond and carob tree groves as well as cultivated fields. The views of the mountains are stunning with the Puig de Galatzó  being the highlight. Around the village stand large country houses. Traditionally these grand estates were the nucleus of village life.

Until the middle of the twentieth century, agriculture and cattle farming were the two main occupations within the area but now many inhabitants commute for 20 minutes into Palma. 

The valley of Puigpunyent was one of the first inhabited areas on the island. This is demonstrated through the amount of talaiots in the area. Examples can be seen in Son Serralta, Son Burguet and Son Puig, plus the necropolis of Casat Nou. These early inhabitants also left proof of their farming activity.

The Romans too inhabited the area and the little that is left of their presence can be found at Es Collet and in the consolidation of the olive, cereal and wine production.

During the Moorish period the village belonged to juz´d´Al-Ahwâz. They left behind their knowledge of the use of irrigation. The six water mills, the numerous water canals, fountains, channels for the torrents, ponds and reservoirs are good examples of their work and development of the horticulture. Found at the Es Ratxo.

After reclaiming the island, and having divided the land as explained in the Llibre del Repartiment (1232), the Catalans arrived under the leadership of the Bishop of Barcelona, Berenguer de Palou, who was given the village of Puigpunyent. For this reason, and until only a few years ago, all the possessions in the village had a hut for the diezmo (a tax that every inhabitant had to pay the Church and represented 10% of their production). The church of Puigpunyent was one of the first to be built in Mallorca, and was authorised by Pope Innocence III, in 1237. During this period the cultivation of olive trees and vineyards increased.

The name of Puigpunyent appears for the first time in a document written in Latin in 1248 as Podio Pugenti. It comes from Puig Punyent or pointed peak, after the shape of the Galatzó Mountain.

Today, Puigpunyent, with an extension of 42.3 Km2, a population of 3.710 inhabitants and a population density of 89.1 hab/km2, is a small municipality located in the west side of the Tramuntana mountain range. In a wide and green valley surrounded by high mountains the most notable of which are Na Fàtima, Na Bauçana, Els Puntals, Es Piconar and, of course, the Puig de Galatzó, with its 1025 metres. These mountains separate us from Calvià on the Migjorn side, from Banyalbufar and Estellencs on the west and from Esporles to the north. Palma is only a ten-minute drive by car and is connected to Puigpunyent through the only existing gap in the valley that follows the course of the river Sa Riera.

Most of the population that makes up the municipality of Puigpunyent and its surrounding area is in the village of Galilea which is found at an elevation of 550 metres above sea level and is only four kilometres from Puigpunyent. Galilea is a magical place of great beauty that was once predominantly an agricultural centre and is now mainly residential. With a population of around 200 inhabitants, it has medieval origins and fabulous views over the migjorn side and the sea.

Today, the municipality can be characterised as a dormitory municipality as most of the population work either in Palma or the coast side, reducing the economical activity to the basic necessities of the inhabitants.

Archaeology 
A 3,200-year-old well-preserved Bronze Age sword was discovered by archaeologists under the leadership of Jaume Deya and Pablo Galera on the Mallorca Island in the Puigpunyent from the stone megaliths site called Talaiot. Specialists assume that the weapon was made when the Talaiotic culture was in critical comedown. The sword will be on display at the nearby Majorca Museum.

References

Municipalities in Mallorca
Populated places in Mallorca